Etienne de Poncins (born 6 March 1964) is a French diplomat, serving since 2019 as the Ambassador of France to Ukraine.

De Poncins was noted as one of the last-remaining senior diplomats in Ukraine (having re-located to Lviv) amidst the 2022 Russian invasion of Ukraine; engaged in distributing French aid to Ukraine. De Poncins told Politico that "you are here in the difficult moments and hours. I would have felt very bad if I had left." De Poncins returned to Kyiv and re-opened the French embassy in the capital on 15 April.

Education and career
De Poncins graduated from Sciences Po and École nationale d'administration and also has a degree in history from the University of Paris.

He has served in various posting as French Ambassador; firstly to Bulgaria (2007–2010) and then to Kenya (2010–2013) and simultaneously Somalia.

References

Living people
1964 births
Ambassadors of France to Ukraine
Diplomats from Paris
École nationale d'administration alumni
People from Suresnes
Sciences Po alumni
Ambassadors to Bulgaria
Ambassadors to Kenya
Ambassadors to Somalia